Alex Xavier Sobers (born November 13, 1998) is a Barbadian swimmer.

He competed at the 2015 World Aquatics Championships, and at the 2016 Summer Olympics in Rio de Janeiro, where he ranked #44 in the 400 m freestyle competition with a time of 3:59.97. He did not advance to the final.

He competed at the 2020 Summer Olympics.

He competed at the collegiate level for Emmanuel College. In 2020, Sobers joined the Boston College Eagles staff as a volunteer assistant coach.

References

External links
 
 

 

1998 births
Living people
Barbadian male swimmers
Olympic swimmers of Barbados
Swimmers at the 2016 Summer Olympics
Pan American Games competitors for Barbados
Swimmers at the 2015 Pan American Games
Commonwealth Games competitors for Barbados
Swimmers at the 2018 Commonwealth Games
Swimmers at the 2019 Pan American Games
Boston College Eagles coaches
College swimming coaches in the United States
College men's swimmers in the United States
Swimmers at the 2020 Summer Olympics
Barbadian expatriate sportspeople in the United States
Sportspeople from Bridgetown